This is a list of chapters of the Jack Frost manhwa. When naming the individual chapters, instead of the word chapter, this manhwa consistently uses the word violence.

List of chapters

Volumes 1-5

References

Lists of manhwa chapters